Bad Lieutenant was an English alternative rock band formed following the second breakup of New Order. The band consisted of former New Order members Bernard Sumner and Phil Cunningham as well as Rambo & Leroy's Jake Evans. 

The name of the band is taken from the 1992 film Bad Lieutenant directed by Abel Ferrara, which a friend of Johnny Marr's was watching when Sumner visited Marr's house.

History

Formation
In May 2007, New Order's Peter Hook was interviewed by British radio station XFM and asked if New Order was over. He announced that he and Bernard Sumner were no longer working together. After Hook's announcement, a spokesperson for the band denied the claims and said that with or without Hook, New Order would continue to make music. However, in 2008, Bernard Sumner announced that there were no plans for more New Order albums.

In 2008, Bad Lieutenant formed, including both Bernard Sumner and Phil Cunningham of New Order, as well as Rambo and Leroy's Jake Evans. Their debut album Never Cry Another Tear also features appearances by Stephen Morris of New Order (Drums), Jack Mitchell (Drums), Tom Chapman (Bass) and Alex James of Blur (Bass). In July 2009 an article in a local newspaper, Stephen Morris discussed his participation in the new band, following the demise of New Order: "I'm only on a few tracks, but it's great to be playing with them again." The live band included Morris on drums and Chapman on bass.

2009–2011: Never Cry Another Tear
On 2 July 2009, Bernard Sumner confirmed that single "Sink or Swim" would be released on 28 September 2009 and would be the first off the album Never Cry Another Tear. The single was hosted for free on the band's website prior to its physical release; it was followed by a digital bundle release with remixes of the song by Berlin-based music producer Mark Reeder, as well as James Bright and The Teenagers.

The band set off on a tour of the UK throughout October and November 2009. The band scheduled and subsequently cancelled four U.S. tour dates. They then supported the Pet Shop Boys on the British leg of their Pandemonium Tour. An additional tour of the U.S. was scheduled for April 2010, but was cancelled due to the Icelandic volcano eruptions.

"Twist of Fate" was released as the second single on 22 March 2010, backed with a remix of "Poisonous Intent". It was followed by a digital bundle of remixes by Mark Reeder, AK47, Koishii & Hush, and James Bright. The group held a contest for fans to create the official video of the song. 

The group spent the summer performing at a number of European music festivals. On 11 June 2010, the group supported Ian Brown in a special day-long concert at Platt Fields Park in Manchester. The band performed songs from their album as well as a number of New Order and Joy Division tracks.

The group contributed a cover of "In the Ghetto" for the charity album Key To Change in aid of Centrepoint; a charity that provides shelter and support for young homeless people in the UK.

On 17 February 2011, Jake Evans announced via the group's MySpace that the group were working on new material, although no dates were given for an album or single release at this time.

On 11 March 2011, the group announced that they would be headlining Friends of Mine Festival at Capesthorne Hall on Friday 20 May alongside The Charlatans, The Lightning Seeds, Buzzcocks, The Fall, The Cribs, The Farm, John Cooper Clarke, Mr Scruff and Goldblade.

The band are now on an indefinite hiatus since Sumner and Cunningham's return to New Order. Evans is currently working on new solo material and supported New Order on their tour in early 2012.

Band members
 Bernard Sumner - Vocals, Backing Vocals, Guitar, Keyboards 
 Phil Cunningham - Guitar, Keyboards
 Jake Evans - Vocals, Backing Vocals, Guitar, Keyboards

Touring members
 Stephen Morris - Drums
 Tom Chapman - Bass

Discography

Studio albums

Singles

References

External links
 
 Bad Lieutenant's LastFm page

English rock music groups
English alternative rock groups
Musical groups established in 2008
Musical groups disestablished in 2011
Universal Motown Records artists